Boating Camping and Fishing or BCF, owned by Super Retail Group, is a transnational chain of retail stores, selling a wide range of outdoor clothing and equipment. According to Super Retail Group, with over 148 stores across Australia, BCF "continues to be the largest outdoor retailer in the country."

References

External links
 
 
 

Retail companies of Australia
Recreational fishing in Australia
Sporting goods retailers of Australia
Super Retail Group